Ashley Lawrence Pullen (18 February 1956 – 6 June 2002) was a former speedway rider in the United Kingdom, who spent much of his career with Rye House Rockets in the National League.

Pullen was a member of the Rye House team that completed the National League Championship and Knockout Cup double in 1980.

Pullen was born in Oxford, England and died from cancer in 2002.

References

1960 births
2002 deaths
British speedway riders
English motorcycle racers
Sportspeople from Oxford
Rye House Rockets riders
Oxford Cheetahs riders
Reading Racers riders
Cradley Heathens riders
Eastbourne Eagles riders
Peterborough Panthers riders
Stoke Potters riders
Milton Keynes Knights riders